Sangye Gya (born November 1942) is a Chinese politician of Tibetan ethnicity who served as chairman of the Qinghai Provincial Committee of the Chinese People's Political Consultative Conference from 2001 to 2007. 

He was an alternate member of the 14th and 15th Central Committee of the Chinese Communist Party. He was a member of the 11th National Committee of the Chinese People's Political Consultative Conference.

Biography
Sangye Gya was born in Ping'an County, Qinghai, in November 1942. In 1959, he was admitted to Qinghai University for Nationalities, majoring in Chinese language and literature. In September 1963, he joined the Qinghai People's Publishing House as an editor and party secretary. 

He joined the Chinese Communist Party in February 1972, and got involved in politics in May 1975, when he was assigned to the Qinghai Provincial Bureau of Culture. He was elevated to deputy head of Qinghai Provincial Publishing Bureau and Qinghai Provincial Department of Culture. In December 1983, he was recalled to the original Qinghai People's Publishing House and appointed president and party branch secretary. He concurrently served as deputy head of the Propaganda Department of the CCP Qinghai Provincial Committee from October 1987 to May 1988. He was deputy party secretary of Qinghai in May 1988, and held that office until January 2001. In January 2001, he was proposed as chairman of the Qinghai Provincial Committee of the Chinese People's Political Consultative Conference, the province's top political advisory body.

References

1942 births
Living people
People from Ping'an
Tibetan politicians
Qinghai University for Nationalities alumni
Central Party School of the Chinese Communist Party alumni
People's Republic of China politicians from Qinghai
Chinese Communist Party politicians from Qinghai
Alternate members of the 14th Central Committee of the Chinese Communist Party
Alternate members of the 15th Central Committee of the Chinese Communist Party